Bon Voyage is a Swiss-German short film written and directed by Marc Raymond Wilkins.

Bon Voyage was shortlisted with ten other short-film from 137 entries submitted to the 89th Academy Awards in Academy Award for Best Live Action Short Film category. The final five nominations are scheduled to be announced on January 24, 2016.

Plot
Jonas and Silvia are enjoying a wonderful sailing holiday in the Mediterranean sea. But while sailing through the night far away from land, they discover an overloaded refugee boat which is close to sinking. They are shocked but too afraid to help. They call the coast guards but lose the boat out of sight into the darkness of the night. In the early morning, they find themselves drifting through an ocean of dead bodies. The refugee boat has sunk. Jonas and Silvia manage to pull a few Syrian survivors out of the cold water. This rescue marks the beginning of a dramatic conflict between the hopes and dreams of the refugees, and the fears and ideals of the holiday sailors.

Cast 
 Jay Abdo as Kareem
 Stefan Gubser as Jonas
 Amed Ali as Thabit
 Annelore Sarbach as Silvia
 Suhair Omran as Maha

Awards and nominations

References

External links
 
 Bon Voyage at Kickstarter 
 

2016 films
Swiss short films
2010s German-language films
2016 drama films
2016 short films
Films set in the Mediterranean Sea
Films about illegal immigration to Europe
Seafaring films